The English Trumpeter is a breed of fancy pigeon developed over many years of selective breeding. English Trumpeters, along with other varieties of domesticated pigeons, are all descendants from the rock pigeon (Columba livia). This is one of the most popular breeds in the USA.
The English Trumpeter is regarded as one of the most ornamental breeds of fancy pigeon. The most distinguishing feature of this breed are the very large muffs on its feet, which often grow to sizes close to its flight-feathers. Combining a tuft, crest and large muffs on their feet, they are challenging to breed.
They are bred in a number of colours which are listed under self, splash and baldhead.

Origin
The name is misleading, as this breed as known today is an American creation.

See also 
List of pigeon breeds

References

Pigeon breeds
Pigeon breeds originating in England